Kansimba Airport  is an airstrip serving the hamlet of Kansimba in Tanganyika Province, Democratic Republic of the Congo.

See also

 Transport in the Democratic Republic of the Congo
 List of airports in the Democratic Republic of the Congo

References

External links
 OpenStreetMap - Kansimba Airport
 OurAirports - Kansimba Airport
 FallingRain - Kansimba Airport
 HERE Maps - Kansimba
 

Airports in Tanganyika Province